Mbalmayo is a town in Cameroon's Centre Region.  The town had 60,091 inhabitants in 2012.  It is the capital of the Nyong-et-So'o Division  It is located at the banks of the Nyong river between Ebolowa and Yaoundé.  It is an agricultural centre and has an important function as a centre of education. It has several primary and secondary schools owned by the government, Roman Catholic Church, Religious bodies and lay Private individuals. It is a beautiful town with many tourist attractions, once in town you can visit the Roman Catholic  cathedral built during the colonial era, the water catchment at Akomnyada, the Marianne Sanctuary at Nkolbindi, two wood transformation factories Exam placage and COCAM, an old German bridge across the Nyong river constructed  by Germans in the early 1900s and so on. The hotel  and lodging sector is fast growing with many modern hotels and lodging structures springing up like mushrooms.

Site of the Mbalmayo National Forestry School.

History
Mbalmayo had existed since 1910 during the German rule of the then Kamerun. Mbalmayo was founded by Mbala Meyo, one of the first ruler of the town. As was the custom of chiefs who rule large communities prior to colonialism, villages and town were named after the chief. This trend of events could be seen in the other neighboring town and villages such as Akonolinga, Nanga Ebogo and Abong Bang, just to name a few.

The Germans had administrative control over the town and made use of the Nyong river for transportation of timber which was a major source of income. Due to its economic potentials, the Germans before the First World War had intended to establish an administrative headquarters in Mbalmayo. Also partly because they found a rock in the Nyong river with a protruded rounded wait which was attractive especially for touristic activities. However, immediately after the first world war in 1919, when Germany had to cede power to the Allied Forces, the project was never realized. The Town was handed to the French as French protectorate by the United Nations.

Economy

Mbalmayo is an industrial town that is about 41 km from Yaoundé the Capital of Cameroon. Mbalmayo is located in the Central Province of Cameroon. It is situated along the Nyong River, south of Yaoundé. Since it is deeply entrenched in the dense equatorial forest zone that stretched to the South, its natural physical environmental features makes it strategically economical located. The main economic activities are forestry and agriculture. There is a plywood factory powered by electricity from the Edea Hydroelectric Power Station.

In order to improve and to increase its economic activities, the Government of Cameroon in 1989, through partnership with the African Development Bank was able to construct a 101 km road that links Mbalmayo with Ebolowa, the capital of the South Province. Amongst its economic activities, Timber exploration is a major source of revenue for Mbalmayo and Cameroon in general. There is the Mbalmayo's forest reserve which is one of Cameroon's oldest forest reserve. Other cash crops include palm oil, palm kernel oil, coffee and cocoa.

Politics
Cameroon was formerly divided administratively into ten provinces now referred to today as regions. Administration of these Regions is based on the administrative set up of Cameroon which is a decentralized state. Mbalmayo is politically and administratively managed under the Central region and a local collectivity called Mbalmayo municipal council. It is a sub-division of the Nyong-et-So'o Division. The administration of the division and the subdivisions is directly under the Ministry of Territorial Administration. Mbalmayo is the administrative headquarters of the Nyong et So'o division. Since independence, this division has been dominated by two political parties but other political political parties do exist in the town such as SDF, UNDP, MRC, UPC etc- The CNU and the CPDM. However, ironically, these two parties were just the same party that underwent a name change. In 1985, CNU was changed to CPDM-Cameroon People Democratic Movement under the leadership of Paul Biya. Since 1968, there have been 6 Mayors elected in Mbalmayo. The longest-serving mayor was AMOUGOU MBIDA Samue but his record has been beaten by the incombent, he served as Mayor of the Municipality  for 17 years. He was also the Mayor in place during the political transition from Amadou Ahidjo to Paul Biya, and from the CNU to the CPDM.

Mayors of the Mbalmayo Municipal Council
 Abbé MBARGA 	Maurice	     1958	    CNU              8 Months	
 MBALLA 	FOE Martin	     1959–1970      CNU	            11 years	
 AMOUGOU	MBIDA Samuel	     1970–1987      CNU-CPDM	    17 years	
 ABAH	Stanisla             1987–1996      CPDM	    9 years	
 NNOMEDOUE MENDOUGA Thomas    1996–2002      CPDM	     6 Years	
 ZANG MBA OBELE	Dieudonné    2002	    CPDM	     current. The first four are of late.

Culture

Transport 

A good transport network is very critical for any real development to take place. Generally, most towns and villages in Cameroon are not easily accessible due to the poor road and transport network. Mbalmayo is, however, accessible by asphalt roads from Yaounde. By train it is the southern terminus of the railroad from Douala. The river Nyong is also commonly used as a mean of transport by locals and fishermen. The river runs for 250 km from Mbalmayo to the east of Abong-Mbang.
Understanding the role of transport in economic development, the Government of Cameroon in 1987, secured a loan worth UA 47.15 million from the African Development Bank to finance the construction of a dual carriage way between Mbalmayo and Ebolowa in the south. The project was completed in 1991 by the firms COGEFAR Cameroon and Razel-Bec and works were supervised by BCEOM Cameroon and LABOGENIE. The project covered over 100 km of paved road.

The project has contributed significantly to opening up of the southern province and made possible the development of agriculture and  forest production in the project area. Since timber harvesting is the biggest contributor to the economy of the southern province, transportation of both humans and goods have been made easy. "Thanks to the improvement of travelling conditions and the lowering of transport costs, women play a more important role in production and in the associative life of the region. Trade, particularly in
food commodities between Cameroon and her neighbours has intensified since the commissioning of the road. Nevertheless, the road’s contribution to increased regional integration will be significant only when the entire Yaoundé-Libreville route, which has several sections in poor condition, has been developed."

Notable people
Jérôme Onguéné (born 1997), association football player

Maps 
 Map

Statistics 

 Elevation = 335m
 Population = 292,000

References 

 Catholic-hierarchy.org
Owana Ndongo Pierre et al., (2008).Mapping Mbalmayo Forest.
Robert John Raison, Alan Gordon Brown, David W. Flinn(2001)Criteria and Indicators for Sustainable Forest Management

. Richard Alemkeng,  a notable of chefferie Mbogkulu bloc C. Teacher of philosophy and citizenship education, lycée bilingue Mbalmayo, Lecturer of journalism and media studies, Education and hotel management. 
Populated places in Centre Region (Cameroon)